Seven Year Setlist is a compilation album by The View, released on 17 June 2013. It charted at No. 7 in the Scottish Albums chart and #59 in the UK Albums Chart.

Description

The compilation is named 'Seven Year Setlist' due to the fact that the track-listing features songs that are most commonly played in the set-lists at the band's concerts (excluding the new tracks).  
The songs are even listed in a similar order to those in their set-lists.

The compilation features several of the band's singles mixed with a couple of album tracks which feature heavily in the band's usual setlist. The album also includes 3 brand new unheard tracks - "Kill Kyle", "Dirty Magazine", and "Standard". These new songs have been produced by Ex-Oasis producer Owen Morris.

Kyle Falconer has said:

"Over the years there's been four studio albums, thousands of gigs, too much vodka and loads of memories on this crazy rock 'n' roll journey. So we wanted to create an album that was kinda like stopping and looking back over the years - with a few new tracks too. That's the Seven Year Setlist."

Singles
"Standard" is the first and only single to be released from 'Seven Year Setlist', in promotion of the album.

Track listing

References

2013 greatest hits albums
The View (band) albums